"Take It Away" is the first single from the Used's second studio album In Love and Death. "Take It Away" was released to radio on August 31, 2004. This song, as well as video, was played during the commercials to promote the album.

Track listings
All songs written by the Used.

CD single 1

CD single 2

7-inch vinyl

Personnel 
The Used
 Bert McCracken - vocals
 Quinn Allman - guitar
 Jeph Howard - bass
 Branden Steineckert - drums

Charts

Notes

The Used songs
2004 singles
2004 songs
Reprise Records singles
Song recordings produced by John Feldmann
Songs written by Quinn Allman
Songs written by Jeph Howard
Songs written by Bert McCracken
Songs written by Branden Steineckert